State Road 462 (NM 462) is a  state highway in the US state of New Mexico. NM 462's western terminus is at U.S. Route 54 (US 54) west of Ancho, and the eastern terminus is at the end of state maintenance in Ancho.

Major intersections

See also

References

462
Transportation in Lincoln County, New Mexico